Billboard Top Country & Western Records of 1952 is made up of two year-end charts compiled by Billboard magazine ranking the year's top country and western records based on record sales and juke box plays.

Hank Thompson's "The Wild Side of Life" spent 15 weeks at No. 1 and was the No. 1 record of 1952 based on both retail sales and juke box plays. Kitty Wells' "It Wasn't God Who Made Honky Tonk Angels", which was an answer song to "The Wild Side of Life, ranked No. 4 on the retail sales chart.

Hank Williams, led all artists with five records included on the year-end charts. His record of "Jambalaya (On the Bayou)" was No. 3 on the year-end retail sales chart while "Half as Much" ranked No. 11 on the same chart.

Carl Smith had four records on the year-end charts. His recording of "Let Old Mother Nature Have Her Way" ranked No. 2 based on both retail sales and juke box plays. 

Lefty Frizzell also had four records on the year-end charts, including the year's No. 6 juke box record, "Give Me More, More, More (Of Your Kisses)".

Columbia Records led the other labels with 11 records on the year-end charts, followed by RCA Victor with nine, and Decca with seven.

See also
List of Billboard number-one country songs of 1952
Billboard year-end top 30 singles of 1952
1952 in country music

Notes

References

1952 record charts
Billboard charts
1952 in American music